Hoshaiah Rabbah or  Hoshayya Rabbah (also "Roba", "Berabbi", Hebrew: אושעיא בריבי) was a Amora of the Land of Israel from the first amoraic generation (about 200 CE), compiler of Baraitot explaining the Mishnah-Tosefta.

Biography
He was closely associated with the successors of Judah ha-Nasi, as was his father with Judah ha-Nasi himself. Hoshaiah's father, Hama, lived in Sepphoris, the residence of Judah ha-Nasi and the seat of the patriarchs.

Hoshaiah's yeshivah, too, was for many years located at Sepphoris, where pupils crowded to hear his lectures. Johanan bar Nappaha, one of his greatest disciples, declared that Hoshaiah in his generation was like Rabbi Meir in his: even his colleagues could not always grasp the profundity of his arguments. And the esteem in which Hoshaiah was held by his pupils may be gauged by the statement that, even after Johanan had himself become a great scholar and a famous teacher and no longer needed Hoshaiah's instruction, he continued visiting the master, who in the meantime had grown old and moved his school to Caesarea.

Hoshaiah's consideration for others is exemplified in his gracious apology to the blind teacher whom he had engaged for his son, and whom he did not suffer to meet visitors at dinner for fear that he might be embarrassed.

Hoshaiah's authority must have been very powerful in his later years, when he successfully resisted the efforts of Gamaliel III, the son of Judah ha-Nasi, to introduce demai into Syria. It is also indicated by his remarkable interposition in regard to the Mishnah which declares that "a Gentile's testimony in the case of an agunah is allowed only if stated as a matter of fact and without any intention to testify".

Teachings

Halacha
Hoshaiah was called the "father of the Mishnah," not so much because of his collection and edition of the mishnayot, as because of the ability with which he explained and interpreted them. His most important halakhic decision is directed against the standard weights and measures, held by R. Johanan to be traditional from the Sinaitic period. Hoshaiah's radical point of view can be traced to his theory of the development of the Mishnah. He even goes so far as to overrule both Beit Shammai and Beit Hillel with reference to offerings brought on visiting the Temple in Jerusalem three times every year. The custom of greeting mourners on Shabbat was permitted in southern Galilee, including Caesarea, and prohibited in other places. Hoshaiah happened to be in a certain town on the Sabbath, and, meeting mourners, greeted them, saying, "I do not know your custom, but I greet you according to our custom".

Aggadah 
Hoshaiah's aggadic teachings are numerous, scattered principally in Midrash Rabbah, which some have erroneously attributed to him because of the opening words "R. Hoshaiah Rabbah." In Genesis Rabbah, Hoshaiah's text with reference to the Creation is the verse "Then I was by him, as one brought up [= אמון] with him". He transposes the letters to read אומן ("an architect"), and explains that "wisdom" (the Torah) was used as an instrument by God to create the universe. He illustrates this by the example of an earthly king who, in building a palace, needs an architect with plans and specifications.

Relations with Origen and Christianity 
Freudenthal points out the analogy between Philo's ideas and those of Hoshaiah, and W. Bacher expresses his opinion that if Hoshaiah had not himself read the philosopher's works, he at least had heard of them from Origen, the most important champion of Philo. In a dialogue with Hoshaiah regarding circumcision, a "philosopher" (identified as Origen by Bacher) asked: "If the rite possesses such virtue, why did not God create the first man circumcised?" Hoshaiah replied that man, with all things created on the first six days, needs improving and perfecting, and that circumcision conduces to perfection. Bacher quotes a passage in which Hoshaiah refuted the incarnation dogma: "When God created Adam the angels mistook him for a deity and wished to sing the hymn 'Holy! Holy! Holy!' But when God put Adam to sleep they knew him to be mortal, as the prophet said: 'Cease ye from man, whose breath is in his nostrils: for wherein is he to be accounted of?'"

There are more examples in the Talmud to justify the assertion that Hoshaiah as the representative of Judaism was in constant touch with the early Christians at Caesarea, and particularly with Origen, who was ordained presbyter at Caesarea in 228, and who in 231 opened a philosophical and theological school which was attended by persons from all parts, anxious to hear his interpretation of the Christian Scriptures. Origen died in 254 at Tyre, so that his last twenty-five years were spent in the region in which most of the Amoraim lived. The "philosopher" whom the latter mention as controverting Hoshaiah's Biblical interpretations was doubtless Origen himself or one of his students. The influence brought to bear by Hoshaiah and others probably induced Origen to formulate the doctrine of the different degrees of dignity in the Trinity, for which Origen was accused as a heretic.

Hoshaiah was very strict in requiring from a proselyte both circumcision and immersion (mikvah) in the presence of three rabbis; this was very likely directed against the free conversion of the Gentiles by the Christian Jews. In a case of partition by heirs or partners the Mishnah says: "They cannot divide the Scriptures between them, even when all parties are satisfied." Hoshaiah adds: "even if they wish to divide by volumes, one to take the Psalms and another the Chronicles". It is explained that such an exchange would be considered as unequal and as giving the impression that one Biblical book is holier than another. This is more easily understood in view of the exaltation by the Judeo-Christians of Psalms over the other books of the Old Testament, especially Chronicles, in contrast with the Jewish view, which recognizes no preference between the various books.

See also
 :Category:Rabbis of the Land of Israel

References

Jewish Encyclopedia bibliography 
 Yuḥasin, ed. Filipowski, p. 118;
 Seder ha-Dorot, ii. 36;
 Z. Frankel, Mebo, p. 74;
 Jolles, Bet Wa'ad, p. 20a;
 W. Bacher, Ag. Pal. Amor. i. 89–108;
 J. Q. R. iii. 357.E

Year of birth missing
Year of death missing
Mishnah rabbis
People from Northern District (Israel)
Talmud rabbis of the Land of Israel